Edwin Claiborne Robins Sr. (1910–1995) was an American chief executive of A.H. Robins pharmaceutical company and a philanthropist.

A.H. Robins 
Robins' grandfather, Albert Hartley Robins, started a drug store in Richmond, Virginia, in 1866. After attending the University of Richmond as an undergraduate and earning a pharmacy degree at the Medical College of Virginia in 1933, Robins built the company up to a Richmond-based multinational giant that manufactured, among other products, Robitussin cough syrup and ChapStick lip balm.

Philanthropy 
Robins served as trustee at the University of Richmond  starting in 1951. By 1969, the university was a small, liberal arts school strongly affiliated with the Southern Baptist church and was poised at bankruptcy. Robins offered what was the largest gift to any university, $50 million in A.H. Robins common stock and $10 million in cash contingent on matching gifts. The university's executives, headed by then-president E. Bruce Heilman and Vice President H. Gerald Quigg, directed the successful effort, ultimately leading to a $60 million addition to the university's endowment.

The gift, along with later gifts, were acknowledged in the naming of the Robins Center arena and the E. Claiborne Robins School of Business.

He also gave extensively to local nonprofits including the Virginia Museum of Fine Arts, the Richmond Public Library (United States), the Medical College of Virginia, and Virginia Union University.

References

American health care chief executives
1910 births
1995 deaths